The 1969 World Figure Skating Championships were held in Colorado Springs, Colorado, USA from February 25 to March 2. At the event, sanctioned by the International Skating Union, medals were awarded in men's singles, ladies' singles, pair skating, and ice dance.

Medal table

Results

Men

Referee:
 Josef Dědič 

Assistant Referee:
 Donald H.Gilchrist 

Judges:
 Benjamin T. Wright 
 Walter Malek 
 Jeanine Donnier-Blanc 
 Milan Duchón 
 Dorothy Leamen 
 Wilhelm Kahle 
 Mollie Phillips 
 Konstantin Likharev 
 Helga von Wiecki 

Substitute judge:
 Rolf J. Steinmann

Ladies

Referee:
 Major Elemér Terták 

Assistant Referee:
 Sonia Bianchetti 

Judges:
 Ardelle K. Sanderson 
 Walburga Grimm 
 Dagmar Řeháková 
 Ludwig Gassner 
 Kinuko Ueno 
 Donald B. Cruikshank 
 Henrik Hajós 
 Michele Beltrami 
 Hans Fuchs 

Substitute judge:
 Rolf J. Steinmann

Pairs

Referee:
 Karl Enderlin 

Assistant Referee:
 Henry M. Beatty 

Judges:
 Nonna Nestegina 
 Benjamin T. Wright 
 Walburga Grimm 
 Emil Skákala 
 Hans Fuchs 
 Dorothy Leamen 
 Monique Georgelin 
 Ludwig Gassner 
 Mollie Phillips 

Substitute judge:
 Rolf J. Steinmann

Ice dance

Referee:
 Lawrence Demmy 

Assistant Referee:
 H. Kendall Kelley 

Judges:
 Robert S. Hudson 
 Mabel Graham 
 Eugen Romminger 
 Barbara Lane 
 Walter Malek 
 Milan Cuchón 
 Henrik Hajós

Sources
 Result list provided by the ISU

World Figure Skating Championships
World Figure Skating Championships
Sports competitions in Colorado Springs, Colorado
International figure skating competitions hosted by the United States
World Figure Skating Championships
World Figure Skating Championships
World Figure Skating Championships
1960s in Colorado Springs, Colorado
World Figure Skating Championships